Thomas S. Winkowski (born 1954) is a retired former Principal Deputy Assistant Secretary for U.S. Immigration and Customs Enforcement (ICE) . He was previously Acting Commissioner of U.S. Customs and Border Protection (CBP). Winkowski has been awarded the Meritorious Presidential Rank Award by President George W. Bush in 2004 and the Distinguished Executive Presidential Rank Award by President Barack Obama in 2009. He was the acting director of ICE until 2014.

References 

Living people
Presidential Rank Award recipients
United States Department of Homeland Security officials
U.S. Immigration and Customs Enforcement officials
Obama administration personnel
1954 births